Robinsonekspedisjonen: 2008 was the eighth season of the Norwegian version of the Swedish show Expedition Robinson, and it premiered on 5 September 2008 and aired until 5 December 2008. The major twist in season eight was the "Heaven and Hell" living areas that the tribes lived in. The North team won the first immunity challenge and earned the right to live in "Heaven", which included huts and beds, while the losers, South team, were forced to live in a bat cave. The season is also remembered for the high amount of contestants to leave the show either voluntarily or in an evacuation. Throughout the season, there were several minor twists put into place such as the elimination duel  
between Manuel and Susanne in episode 2 and the double elimination the South team faced when they chose to through a challenge in order to eliminate a team member. The biggest twist of all occurred when the teams merged. At the time of the merge there were only seven original contestants left in the tribe, however due to the amount of contestants who left early, three reserves entered. Preceding the merge was an elimination challenge which George Stephen Vaz lost, however it was later revealed that this was not a real elimination challenge and that he could earn a spot back in the game if he won it against the contestant of his choice. Vaz chose Hege Reime as his opponent and won the duel. Unlike in most years, instead of there being a final four there was a final three that faced off in a challenge to determine who would face the jury. Ultimately, it was Tom Tveitan who won the season over Britt Carin Jonassen with an unknown jury vote.

Finishing order

Voting history

Rich/Poor Divide
As was the twist this season, beginning after the first reward challenge the winning tribe would be sent to live an island full of luxuries while the losing tribe was sent to live in a cave. In episode six Nelden chose to voluntarily leave the game in exchange for a prize trip. By doing this he automatically sent the remaining two members of South back to the cave.

External links
http://www.vg.no/rampelys/artikkel.php?artid=529973
http://www.vg.no/iphone/article.php?artid=524891
http://www.worldofbigbrother.com

 2008
2008 Norwegian television seasons